The 2014 American Ultimate Disc League season was the third season for the league. Each team played a 14-game schedule. The San Jose Spiders won the AUDL Championship III over the Toronto Rush in Toronto, Ontario, Canada. The Spiders enjoyed the most successful season of all teams, finishing with a 16-1 record. Their only loss came to the San Francisco FlameThrowers in Week 6.

Offseason

Expansion
 The Montreal Royal, the San Jose Spiders, the Seattle Raptors, the Salt Lake Lions, the San Francisco Flamethrowers, and the Vancouver Riptide joined the league.

Renaming
 The Windy City Wildfire change their name to the Chicago Wildfire

Contraction
 The New Jersey Hammerheads suspended operations due to financial issues

Regular Season Standings

Eastern Division

Midwestern Division

Western Division

 T indicates top seed in the playoffs. P indicates a team advanced to the playoffs. PD indicates point difference.

Playoffs
The playoffs expanded to 8 teams in 2014.

See also
UltiAnalytics AUDL team and player statistics

References

American Ultimate Disc League
American Ultimate Disc League